Bone Bay is a rectangular bay along the northwest coast of Trinity Peninsula. It is nearly 10 nautical miles (18 km) wide at the entrance between Notter Point and Cape Roquemaurel.  The bay and most of its constituent features were charted by the Falkland Islands Dependencies Survey (FIDS) in 1948, and later named by United Kingdom Antarctic Place-Names Committee (UK-APC). Bone Bay was named after Thomas M. Bone, midshipman on the brig Williams used in exploring the South Shetland Islands and Bransfield Strait in 1820.

There are several named islands and rocks in the bay.

References

Geography of Antarctica